Adolf Dauthage (Vienna, 20 February 1825 – Rustendorf, 3 June 1883) was an Austrian lithographer who produced many portrait lithographs. After a period of study at the Vienna Academy, he worked in the studio of Josef Kriehuber for four years.

References 
 
 Dauthage, Adolph. In Constantin von Wurzbach, Biographisches Lexikon des Kaisertums Österreich, Vol. 3, p. 174, Vienna 1858

External links 

19th-century Austrian people
Austrian lithographers
Austrian artists
Portrait artists
Artists from Vienna
1825 births
1883 deaths
Academy of Fine Arts Vienna alumni